"Close" is a song by British DJ and record producer Sub Focus. It was released on 21 April 2014 as the seventh single from his second studio album Torus. The song featured vocals from British singer MNEK in the album version. The vocals on the single version are performed by British singer Daniel Pearce. The new vocals were re-produced by Hal Ritson, who also provided backing vocals.

Music video
The official music video to accompany the release of the single was premiered through YouTube on 22 May 2014. It was directed by Brendan Canty and produced by Feel Good Lost and LoveLive. It was filmed during the Sub Focus LIVE event at O2 Academy Brixton on 17 April 2014. The video runs at a total duration of three minutes and fifty-four seconds.

Track listing

Credits and personnel

 Writer – Uzoechi Emenike
 Producer – Nick Douwma
 Vocal production – Hal Ritson
 Lead vocals – Daniel Pearce
 Backing vocals – Daniel Pearce, Hal Ritson
 Label – Virgin EMI Records, Mercury Records, RAM Records

Chart performance

Weekly charts

Release history

References

2013 songs
2014 singles
Sub Focus songs
MNEK songs
Mercury Records singles
RAM Records singles
Virgin EMI Records singles
Deep house songs
Songs written by MNEK
Songs written by Sub Focus